Lovesighs – An Entertainment was a mini-album released by No-Man in 1992 on the One Little Indian label. It comprised a collection of the band's singles and b-sides from 1990 and 1991.

An ambitious and diverse collection of sensual songs and innovative instrumentals, the album  combined influences from dub, dream pop, classical and hip-hop music.

Both "Colours" and "Days In The Trees" were singles of the week in Melody Maker, Sounds and on Channel Four's teletext.

Lovesighs was trailed by a further single "Ocean Song".

"Days in the Trees" shares its main melody with the Porcupine Tree track "Mute" (from 1994's Yellow Hedgerow Dreamscape).

Track listing
All songs written by Steven Wilson & Tim Bowness except as noted.
"Heartcheat Pop" – 3:52
 "Days in the Trees (Mahler)" (Wilson, Bowness, G. Fenton)– 6:21
 "Drink Judas" – 3:44
 "Heartcheat Motel" – 4:38
 "Kiss Me Stupid" – 4:42
 "Colours" (Donovan) – 4:10
 "Iris Murdoch Cut Me Up" – 5:19
 "Days in the Trees (Reich)" (Wilson) – 2:35

Personnel
Tim Bowness – vocals, words
Ben Coleman – violin
Steven Wilson – instruments

with:
Lara Flynn Boyle – sampled voice (8)
Patricia Leavitt – sampled voice (1)

References

External links
No-Man's Official Website
No-Man's Fan Site

1992 EPs
No-Man albums
One Little Independent Records EPs